The 1977 Spanish motorcycle Grand Prix was the fifth round of the 1977 Grand Prix motorcycle racing season. It took place on 22 May 1977 at the Circuito Permanente del Jarama.

350 cc classification

250 cc classification

125 cc classification

50 cc classification

References

Spanish motorcycle Grand Prix
Spain
Motorcycle Grand Prix